Dehgah (also Romanized as Dehgāh; also known as Dahka, Dehkā, and Dehkāh) is a village in Dehgah Rural District, Kiashahr District, Astaneh-ye Ashrafiyeh County, Gilan Province, Iran. At the 2006 census, its population was 2,085, in 664 families.

References 

Populated places in Astaneh-ye Ashrafiyeh County